The men's +95 kg competition in judo at the 1992 Summer Olympics in Barcelona was held on 27 July at the Palau Blaugrana. The gold medal was won by David Khakhaleishvili of the Unified Team.

Results

Main brackets

Pool A

Pool B

Repechages

Repechage A

Repechage B

Final

Final classification

References

External links
 

M96
Judo at the Summer Olympics Men's Heavyweight
Men's events at the 1992 Summer Olympics